Jinxian South railway station is a railway station of Hangchangkun Passenger Railway located in Jinxian County, Nanchang, Jiangxi, People's Republic of China.

Railway stations in Jiangxi